Ashdod are an Israeli football club based in Ashdod. The 2020–21 season will the clubs 21st competitive campaign since the club were formed. During this season the club will have competed in the following competitions: Israeli Premier League,  State Cup, Toto Cup Al.

Current squad 
Updated 12 July 2020.

Out on loan

Transfers

In

Out

Competitions

Club Friendlies

Israeli Premier League

Results summary

Results by round

Matches

League table

State Cup

Toto Cup Al

Group C

References

1. *Betexplorer
2. *Soccerway
3. *World Football

External links
 Moadon Sport Ironi Ashdod Israel Football Association

F.C. Ashdod seasons
Ashdod